Your Face Sounds Familiar sometimes abbreviated as (YFSF)  is an Albanian TV series. It is one of several dozen local versions of the Your Face Sounds Familiar format. The first series started airing on 14 March 2016. The host is Alketa Vejsiu and the broadcaster is TV Klan.

Season 01 
The first season started to air on 14 March 2016 and ended on 7 June 2016 on TV Klan. In every episode, before the host arrives, in the introduction, eight dancers dance to "Let's Get Loud".

Contestants 
 Adelina Tahiri
 Anxhela Peristeri
 Besnik Çaka
 Endri Prifti
 Era Rusi
 Kastro Zizo
 Rozana Radi

Judges 
Bleona Qereti
Arian Cani
Bojken Lako

Celebrities impersonated

Episode 01 
Since it was the first episode, two judges (Bojken & Bleona) both impersonated an artist; Arian did not.

Episode 02

Episode 03

Episode 04

Episode 05

Episode 06

Episode 07 (Albanians Special)

Episode 08

Episode 09

Episode 10

Episode 11

Episode 12

Episode 13 (Finale)

Season 02 
The second season started to air on 21 February 2017 and ended on 5 June 2017 on TV Klan. The introduction was refreshed.

Contestants 
 Beatrix Ramosaj
 Flaka Krelani
 Herion Mustafaraj
 Shpat Kasapi
 Arinda Gjoni
 Valon Shehu

Other acts 
 Marjana & Xumi
 Ana Kodra

Judges 
Alberie Hadergjonaj
Olta Gixhari
Arian Cani

Celebrities impersonated

Episode 01

Episode 02

Episode 03

Episode 04

Episode 05

Episode 13

Notes

Albania
Albanian television shows
Television shows filmed in Albania
Television shows set in Albania
Televizioni Klan original programming